Ramakrishna Mission Vidyalaya may refer to:

 Ramakrishna Mission Vidyalaya, Coimbatore
 Ramakrishna Mission Vidyalaya, Narendrapur
 Ramakrishna Mission school